Cape Simpson is a headland in the Greenland Sea, Northeast Greenland. Administratively it is part of the NE Greenland National Park.

History
This headland was named "Cape Simpson" in 1822 by William Scoresby (1789 – 1857). Numerous remains of former Inuit habitation were found at that time in the area near the cape.

Materials for a Norwegian hunting station known as "Simpson Stranda" were brought to the area of the headland by Norwegian ship Veslekari in 1929, but the hut was never built. Another hut, "Kap Simpson Hytte", was built by the Sirius Dog Sled Patrol between 1955 and 1956.

Geography
Cape Simpson is located in the Greenland Sea, north of Cape Biot on the opposite side of the mouth of Davy Sound. 

Cape Simpson rises at the southeastern end of Traill Island, whose shore trending northwest of the cape forms the northeastern coast of Davy Sound. It is a conspicuous headland. The Vandyke Cliffs, steep and displaying multicolored strata, rise above the cape at a sheer angle right from the shore. Dream Bay (Drømmebugten) is located about  WNW of the headland and larger Mountnorris Fjord to the northeast. Most of the years the sea around the cape is filled with ice, even in the summer.

Bibliography

See also
Geography of Greenland

References

External links
 Greenland Pilot - Danish Geodata Agency 

Headlands of Greenland